London Buses route 100 is a Transport for London contracted bus route in London, England. Running between St Paul's and Shadwell, it is operated by London Central.

History
Between 1934 and October 1972 there was a route 100 operating between Barking and Beckton Gas Works.

The current route 100 commenced operating on 10 June 1989 from Liverpool Street station to Shadwell via Aldgate, Tower Hill and Wapping. It was operated by Leaside Buses' Clapton garage. On 24 February 1990, it was transferred to East London's Bow garage, and again on 26 September 1992 to Stratford.
 	
Upon being re-tendered, it was retained by East London with a new contract commencing on 28 February 1998. Route 100 was extended from Liverpool Street to Elephant & Castle via London Wall and Blackfriars Bridge on 18 September 1999.

When next tendered, it passed to Travel London's Walworth garage on 18 September 2004.

Route 100 was included in the 21 May 2009 sale of Travel London to Abellio London. On 19 September 2009, Abellio London commenced a further contract to operate the route.

When next tendered, the contract to operate the route was awarded to London General with the handover occurring on 20 September 2014.

In September 2016, Transport for London opened a consultation on changing the route to only operate between Wapping and the Museum of London. The route was amended to operate between Shadwell and the London Wall on 8 April 2017 with route 388 replacing it to Elephant & Castle.

As part of TfL's Central London Buses Review, route 100 was extended from London Wall to St Paul's.

In February 2020, a trial started to increase awareness of the electric buses introduced on the route by playing a warning sound when the bus is at low speed, stationary or reversing.

Current route
Route 100 operates via these primary locations:
St Paul's Station 
London Wall
Moorgate station    
Wormwood Street
Aldgate station 
Tower Gateway station 
St Katharine Docks
Wapping station 
Tobacco Dock
Shadwell station

References

External links 

 

Bus routes in London
Transport in the City of London
Transport in the London Borough of Tower Hamlets